Samuel Emery Chamberlain (November 27, 1829 – November 10, 1908) was an American soldier, painter, and author who traveled throughout the American Southwest and Mexico during the mid-19th century.

Early life

Chamberlain was born in Center Harbor, New Hampshire, to Ephraim Chamberlain and soon afterward moved to Boston, Massachusetts, where he spent most of his childhood. In 1844, at age 15, he left home without permission to go to Illinois. Two years later he joined the 2nd Illinois Volunteer Regiment and headed to Texas to participate in the Mexican–American War. In San Antonio, Chamberlain joined the regular army and became part of the 1st U.S. Dragoons. He fought at the Battle of Buena Vista in February 1847 as well as several other operations in Mexico. In 1849, he was declared a deserter and by 1854 he had returned home to Boston to raise a family. He married Mary Keith on July 4, 1855, and they had three children.

By his own account, Chamberlain was also involved in some less savory aspects of the Texas–Mexico border disputes. Most notably, he rode for a time with the infamous Glanton gang under the command of John Glanton, which was contracted by Mexican authorities to track and kill hostile Apaches following the war. The gang became notorious for taking scalps under highly questionable circumstances to claim the bounties, and its members were eventually declared outlaws by the Mexican government. Chamberlain's memoirs regarding this period are the only known primary source attesting to the existence of the Texian known as Judge Holden, Glanton's second-in-command. While Chamberlain and some others escaped, Glanton and a number of his gang were massacred by Yumas near what is now Yuma, Arizona, in April 1850.

Civil War

During the American Civil War, after being chief of staff to Brigadier General William W. Averell and Lieutenant Colonel of the 1st Massachusetts Cavalry Regiment, Chamberlain commanded Camp Parole at Annapolis, Maryland, for a time and also commanded the 5th Massachusetts Colored Cavalry, an all African-American unit, with the rank of colonel. He was wounded on six occasions during the war. On February 24, 1865, President Abraham Lincoln nominated Chamberlain for the award of the honorary grade of brevet brigadier general, U.S. Volunteers, to rank from February 24, 1865, and the U.S. Senate confirmed the award on March 3. Chamberlain was mustered out of the U.S. Volunteers on September 16, 1865.

Later life

After the war, Chamberlain was a warden of state prisons in Massachusetts and Connecticut. Settling in Massachusetts with his family, Chamberlain became well-known for his charming paintings, which consist largely of landscapes and battle scenes depicting the Mexican–American War. A large collection is held at the San Jacinto Museum of History.

Chamberlain also authored and illustrated a harrowing autobiographical account of his travels during the 1840s, especially his service in the Mexican–American War and his adventures with the Glanton gang, entitled My Confession: The Recollections of a Rogue, which he wrote between 1855 and 1861. Though many of its stories are exaggerated in the romantic literary style popular at the time, research has corroborated most of them as true. Noted for its authentic descriptions of the experiences of the typical American soldier during the Mexican–American War, Chamberlain's account continues to serve as a valuable primary source text for historians studying the war and the era as a whole. The account also served as the basis for author Cormac McCarthy's 1985 novel Blood Meridian; the novel's protagonist, known only as "the kid", is said to be loosely based on Chamberlain.

Chamberlain died on November 10, 1908 in Worcester, Massachusetts, and was buried in Mount Auburn Cemetery.

See also

List of Massachusetts generals in the American Civil War
Massachusetts in the American Civil War

Notes

References

Chamberlain, Samuel E.: My Confession: Recollections of a Rogue; ed. WH Goetzmann. Grimes, William
Eicher, John H. and Eicher, David J., Civil War High Commands. Stanford University Press, Stanford, CA, 2001. .
Goetzmann, William H.: Sam Chamberlain's Mexican War: The San Jacinto Museum of History Paintings
"William H. Goetzmann, Pulitzer-Winning Historian, Dies at 80", The New York Times, September 11, 2010. Retrieved 2010-09-12.
Hunt, Roger D. and Brown, Jack R., Brevet Brigadier Generals in Blue. Gaithersburg, MD: Olde Soldier Books, Inc., 1990. .

Gallery

External links

Images of the U.S.-Mexican War — Sam Chamberlain's Mexican War Watercolor Paintings
Samuel E. Chamberlain's My Confession from Texas State Historical Association
My Confession from the Internet Archive
part 1 of Chamberlain's account .pp.68–91
Part 2 of Chamberlain's account .pp.52–74
Part 3 of Chamberlain's account .pp.64–83; epilogue.p.86
.p.9-10 Letters written by Chamberlain

1829 births
1908 deaths
19th-century American painters
20th-century American painters
American male painters
19th-century American memoirists
American military personnel of the Mexican–American War
Military art
People of Massachusetts in the American Civil War
People from Center Harbor, New Hampshire
Union Army colonels
19th-century American male artists
20th-century American male artists